Drenair was an airline based in Madrid, Spain.

History
Drenair was founded in 1986 by Spanish entrepreneur Salvador Sanchís Pavía, who would be also the owner of the company, together with Rafael Murcia Llorens. It operated domestic passenger and cargo services. The airline went bankrupt in 1996 and was subsequently bailed out, but owing to mounting losses it ceased operations in 2003.

Code data
ICAO Code: DRS (not current)

Fleet
Drenair used different aircraft along its history. 
1 Dassault Falcon 20D
13 Grumman Gulfstream I 
1 Aérospatiale SN 601 Corvette

References

External links

Pictures of Drenair planes abandoned at Madrid Airport

Airlines established in 1986
Airlines disestablished in 2003
Defunct airlines of Spain